Hamipteridae (or hamipterids) is a small family of anhanguerian pterosaurs known from the Early Cretaceous of China and Spain.

Classification
The cladogram below follows the topology recovered by Pêgas et al. (2019). In the analysis, they assigned Hamipteridae as the sister taxon of the family Anhangueridae, both within the larger clade Anhangueria.

References

Pteranodontoids
Prehistoric reptile families